John A. Oates House is a historic home located at Fayetteville, Cumberland County, North Carolina. It is a late-18th / early 19th century dwelling remodeled in 1909.  It is a two-story, five-bay frame Classical Revival style frame dwelling.  It features a two-story pedimented portico supported by four fluted columns.

It was listed on the National Register of Historic Places in 1983.

The Oates House has since been relocated to a Fayetteville country club where it has been repurposed as a private clubhouse.

References

Houses on the National Register of Historic Places in North Carolina
Neoclassical architecture in North Carolina
Houses completed in 1909
Houses in Fayetteville, North Carolina
National Register of Historic Places in Cumberland County, North Carolina